The 2nd Jebtsundamba Khutughtu (1724-1757), was the second incarnation of the Jebtsundamba Khutuktu, the spiritual heads of the Gelug lineage of Tibetan Buddhism in Outer Mongolia. His personal name was Luvsandambiydonmi and his Tibetan ceremonial name Blo-bzang-bstan-pa'i-srgon-me.

Biography 
He was chosen as the second incarnation after the death of Öndör Gegeen Zanabazar, the first Jebtsundamba Khutuktu.

Like Zanabazar, the second Jebtsundamba also was a member of Mongolia's highest nobility and direct descendant of Genghis Khan. After Chingünjav's rebellion and the successive demise of the second Jebtsundamba Khutugtu, the Qianlong Emperor decreed in 1758 that all future reincarnations were to be found from among the population of Tibet.

1724 births
1757 deaths
Jebtsundamba Khutuktus
Qing dynasty Tibetan Buddhists